The surname Brik may have several origins.
 Brik may be a Jewish surname usually from the Yiddish word  brik - bridge.
 Belarusian or Ukrainian surname Brik may be derived from the old Polish verb brykac (via an intermediate form Bryk), that means "to gambol".
 Brik is also a Tunisian pastry (börek).

People 

 (born 1981), Russian film and theater actress
 (1915-1983), Hero of the Soviet Union
 (1879-1947), Ukrainian scientist, philologist, Slavist, historian, social activist and teacher
 (1842-1925), Austrian bridge technician and university teacher
 (1899-1982), Austrian Benedictine
 Lilya Brik (1891-1978), Russian Jewish actress (sometimes misspelled Birk)
 Osip Brik (1888-1945), (sometimes misspelled Birk)
Valentyna Brik (born 1985), Ukrainian Paralympic volleyballist
Taoufik Ben Brik (born 1960), a Tunisian journalist
Mariem Brik (born 1980), Tunisian female volleyball player

See also
Bryk

References

Jewish surnames
Yiddish-language surnames